Living with Ghosts is the debut studio album by American singer-songwriter Patty Griffin. It was released on May 21, 1996 by A&M Records. According to Billboard, this is Griffin's best-selling album and had sold over 222,000 copies in the United States as of January 2010.

Track listing

Personnel
Patty Griffin - vocals, guitar
Adam Steinberg - guitar and arrangement on "Let Him Fly"
Ty Tyler - high-string guitar on "Time Will Do the Talking"
Technical
Steve Barry - recording, mixing

References

1996 debut albums
A&M Records albums
Patty Griffin albums